The United States Senate election in California of 1940 was held on November 5, 1940. Incumbent Republican Senator Hiram Johnson was re-elected to his fifth term in office, though he would die in office in 1945.

By cross-filing and winning the Democratic and Progressive primaries, Johnson eliminated his strongest competition and handily won the general election with only nominal opposition from the Prohibition Party.

Primaries
Primaries were held on August 27.

Republican primary

Candidates
 John Anson Ford, member of the Los Angeles County Board of Supervisors for District 3 (cross-filing)
 Hiram Johnson, incumbent Senator
 Ellis E. Patterson, Lieutenant Governor (cross-filing)
 Sam Yorty, State Assemblyman (cross-filing)

Results

Democratic primary

Candidates
 John Anson Ford, member of the Los Angeles County Board of Supervisors for District 3
 Hiram Johnson, incumbent Senator (cross-filing)
 James D. Meredith
 Richard S. Otto
 Ellis E. Patterson, Lieutenant Governor
 Sam Yorty, State Assemblyman

Results

Progressive primary

Candidates
 Hiram Johnson, incumbent Senator (cross-filing)
 Richard S. Otto

Results

Prohibition primary

Candidates
 Fred Dyster
 Hiram Johnson, incumbent Senator (write-in)

Results

Third parties and independents

Communist
 Anita Whitney, women's rights activist, perennial candidate, and member of the Field family

Independent
A write-in bid was launched in support of John Anson Ford.

General election

Results

See also 
  United States Senate elections, 1940

References 

1940 California elections
California
1940